The du Bellay family is a French noble family from the historic Anjou region. Their origins go back to the twelfth century and they lend their name from the grounds of the château du Bellay in Allonnes (Maine-et-Loire department).

Notable members of the family include:
Jean du Bellay (c. 1493-1560), cardinal and diplomat
Guillaume du Bellay (1491-1543), writer and general
Joachim du Bellay (c. 1522-1560), poet
Martin du Bellay (1495–1559), chronicler

External links
Du Bellay family tree and bios

 
French noble families